The wildlife of Eswatini is composed of its flora and fauna. The country has 107 species of mammals and 507 species of birds.

Fauna

Mammals

Birds

Insects

Flora
Grassland, savanna, mixed bush, and scrub cover most of Swaziland. There is some forest in the highlands. Flora include aloes, orchids, and begonias.

References

Biota of Eswatini
Eswatini